ADTC may refer to:
Adult Diagnostic and Treatment Center, Avenal, New Jersey
Adult Drug Treatment Court
Area Drug and Therapeutics Committee, a division of Healthcare Improvement Scotland, UK government agency
Armament Development and Test Center, Eglin Air Force Base, Florida